Asadollahabad or Asdollahabad may refer to:
 Asadollahabad, Khuzestan
 Asdollahabad, Mazandaran